WildFly, formerly known as JBoss AS, or simply JBoss, is an application server written by JBoss, now developed by Red Hat. WildFly is written in Java and implements the Java Platform, Enterprise Edition (Java EE) specification. It runs on multiple platforms.

WildFly is free and open-source software, subject to the requirements of the GNU Lesser General Public License (LGPL), version 2.1.

Origin 
In 1999, Marc Fleury started a free software project named EJB-OSS (stands for Enterprise Java Bean Open Source Software) implementing the EJB API from J2EE (Java 2 Enterprise Edition). Sun Microsystems asked the project to stop using the trademarked EJB within its name. EJB-OSS was then renamed to JBOSS, then JBoss later.

On November 20, 2014, JBoss Application Server was renamed WildFly. The JBoss Community and other Red Hat JBoss products like JBoss Enterprise Application Platform were not renamed.

Licensing and pricing 
JBoss EAP itself is open source, but Red Hat charges to provide a support subscription for JBoss Enterprise Middleware. Before November 2010 JBoss was licensed as annual subscription in bundles of 4 and 32 CPU sockets. As of November 2010 the licensing changed and all cores on the system are now counted. The core bundles licensing is available for 2, 16, and 64 cores.

See also 

 List of application servers
 Netty (software)
 List of JBoss software

Notes

References 

  402 pp.
  468 pp.
  306 pp.
  496 pp.
  648 pp.

External links 
 

Cross-platform software
Free software programmed in Java (programming language)
Java enterprise platform
Portal software
Red Hat software
Web server software programmed in Java